Echoes of the Goddess: Tales of Terror and Wonder From the End of Time is a collection of fantasy short stories by American writer Darrell Schweitzer, a prequel to his novel The Shattered Goddess (1983). The book is illustrated with a cover and frontispiece by Stephen Fabian. It was first published as a trade paperback by Wildside Press in February 2013.

Summary
The collection consists of a cycle of eleven stories originally published from 1982-1991 in various fantasy and science fiction magazines, together with a prologue original to the collection. Some of the stories were revised for book publication. The stories follow the fortunes of various characters living on a magic-ridden far future Earth in the age of chaotic miracles between the death of the world's latest divinity, the Goddess, and the birth of a new one. Among the protagonists are a wizard's shadow striving to become human, two fratricidal brother sorcerers engaged in a feud lasting centuries, a musician who becomes lord of death, a visionary boy priest, and a witch in love with a god.

Contents
 "Prologue"
 "The Stones Would Weep" (from Fantasy Tales v. 6, no. 12, Win. 1983)
 "The Story of a Dadar" (from Amazing Science Fiction Stories v. 56, no. 1, Jun. 1982)
 "The Diminishing Man" (from Fantasy Book, v. 3, no. 3-4, Sep.-Dec. 1984)
 "A Lantern Maker of Ai Hanlo" (from Amazing Stories v. 58, no. 2, Jul. 1984)
 "Holy Fire" (from Weirdbook 17, 1983)
 "The Stolen Heart" (from Weirdbook 26, Aut. 1991)
 "Immortal Bells" (from Weirdbook 18, 1983)
 "Between Night and Morning" (from Weirdbook 20, Spr. 1985)
 "The Shaper of Animals" (from Amazing Stories v. 62, no. 2, Jul. 1987)
 "Three Brothers" (from Weirdbook 23/24, 1988)
 "Coming of Age in the City of the Goddess" (from Fantasy Book v. 4, no. 2, Jun. 1985)

Reception
The collection was reviewed by John R. Fultz at blackgate.com, Feb. 20, 2013, and Richard A. Lupoff in Locus no. 629, June 2013.

Notes

2013 short story collections
Short story collections by Darrell Schweitzer
Fantasy short story collections
Dying Earth (genre)
Wildside Press books